Lovers in Prague is a 2005 South Korean television drama series starring Jeon Do-yeon, Kim Joo-hyuk, Kim Min-jun and Yoon Se-ah. It aired on SBS from September 24 to November 20, 2005 on Saturdays and Sundays at 21:45 for 18 episodes.

It is the second of three TV series in the Lovers trilogy by writer Kim Eun-sook and director Shin Woo-chul. This was preceded by Lovers in Paris (2004), and the third, simply titled Lovers (2006), was not set in Europe like the first two.

Plot
The president's daughter, Yoon Jae-hee (Jeon Do-yeon) is a Korean diplomat in Prague, Czech Republic. She has only recently recovered from a devastating break up five years earlier with Ji Young-woo (Kim Min-jun), the son of a prominent Korean businessman. Choi Sang-hyun (Kim Joo-hyuk) is a detective who goes to Prague searching for his ex-girlfriend Hye-joo (Yoon Se-ah). Hye-joo broke up with Sang-hyun over the phone from Prague and Sang-hyun cannot accept it.

Sang-hyun meets Jae-hee in Prague and misunderstandings abound. Eventually the two help each other and become friends. When they return to Korea love blossoms, but their respective exes and very different social status put it to the test.

Cast
Jeon Do-yeon as Yoon Jae-hee
The daughter of the President and an incumbent diplomat. She is upright and enthusiastic about her profession. After she passed the Civil Service Examination for Foreign Affairs, she was sent to Prague for her first assignment where she met Young-woo and fell in love with him.

Kim Joo-hyuk as Choi Sang-hyun
A detective. He decided to become one as no policeman could help him solve a hit-and-run case, which killed his parents. Although hot-tempered and rush, he is kind-hearted. He meets Hye-joo when he was sent to solve a robbery case and fell in love with her; and helped fund her studies in Prague. After Hye-joo breaks up with him, he heads to Prague to look for her and there, he meets Jae-hee.

Kim Min-jun as Ji Young-woo
A public prosecutor and the son of the chairman of a leading conglomerate, who grew up without family love. Not wanting to be under his father's shadow, he graduated from law school and passed the Judicial Examination. After he was exposed to the spotlight, he went backpacking in Prague to avoid everything. He met Jae-hee there and fell in love with her. However, he was separated from her after his father's interjection. When meets her again, she already fell in love with Sang-hyun.

Yoon Se-ah as Kang Hye-joo
An orphan, who seems fragile but is strong. She becomes a kindergarten teacher after graduating from community college. One day, she meets Sang-hyun and fell in love with him. She heads to Prague to further her studies with the help of Sang-hyun, but unfortunately becomes pregnant. Her intent to climb to the top with wrong choices caused her to break up with Sang-hyun. After realizing her mistakes, she wants to reconcile with him.
Lee Jung-gil as the Yoon Jung-han, Jae-hee's father, the President of Republic of Korea
Jang Keun-suk as Yoon Gun-hee, Jae-hee's younger brother
Jung Dong-hwan as Ji Kyung-hwan, Young-woo's father, the chairman of the Taesung Group
Ha Jung-woo as Ahn Dong-nam, Jae-hee's bodyguard
Yoon Young-joon as Suh Yoon-kyu, Jae-hee's friend and co-worker
Kim Seung-wook as Hwang Dal-ho, Sang-hyun's partner
Kim Na-woon as Shin Kwang-ja, Sang-hyun's aunt
Andy Lee as Ji Seung-woo, Young-woo's younger half-brother
Kwak Ji-min as Jung Yeon-soo, high school student
Park Jae-min as Mrs. Young
Won Duk-hyun as a student
Shim Eun-kyung as a student
Hahm Eun-jung as a student

Reception
Ratings for the drama averaged 26–27% (31% at its peak), partly due to Jeon's return to television after a three-year hiatus. At the 2005 SBS Drama Awards, Jeon Do-yeon was awarded the Daesang ("grand prize"), and Kim Joo-hyuk won Top Excellence Award. Kim also won Best Actor for TV at the 42nd Baeksang Arts Awards.

Ratings
In the table below, the blue numbers represent the lowest ratings and the red numbers represent the highest ratings.

Source: TNS Media Korea

Awards and nominations

References

External links 
  
 
 

2005 South Korean television series debuts
2005 South Korean television series endings
Seoul Broadcasting System television dramas
Korean-language television shows
South Korean romance television series
Television shows set in the Czech Republic
Television shows written by Kim Eun-sook
Works set in Prague